Candidate 1 (also known as C1 or Alpha Centauri Ab) is an unconfirmed exoplanet candidate directly imaged around Alpha Centauri A in February 2021. If confirmed as an exoplanet, it would orbit at approximately 1.1 AU away from Alpha Centauri A with a period of about a year and would have a mass between that of Neptune and one-half that of Saturn and would therefore likely be a gas giant. The planet candidate is yet to be confirmed as an exoplanetary signal; additional observations are needed to confirm its true nature.

History
Astronomers from the Breakthrough Watch Initiative directly imaged the habitable-zone candidate using a newly developed system for mid-infrared exoplanet imaging. Previous observations from years before ruled out the possibility of it being a background star. The team presented the discovery of the exoplanet candidate in a publication in Nature Communications titled “Imaging low-mass planets within the habitable zone of Alpha Centauri.” However, the observation arc, being only 100 hours long, is not enough to determine whether a signal is planetary in nature, and it may be zodiacal dust or an instrumental artifact.

The possible detection of the planet is extremely preliminary, and the object may not even  count as a planetary candidate.

Physical characteristics
While little is known about the candidate planet, there are some characteristics that may be inferred based on its observations. It would have an orbital inclination of ~70° relative to Earth's point of view, consistent with the inclination of the Alpha Centauri system as a whole. Due to this large size, it is highly unlikely to be rocky and is probably a Neptune-sized planet. Follow-up observations will be needed to determine whether it is a planet, cloud of dust, or simply an artifact due to its short observation arc.

See also 
 Lists of exoplanets
 List of directly imaged exoplanets
 List of largest exoplanets
 List of nearest exoplanets

References 

Alpha Centauri
Exoplanet candidates